The 1980 season was the Minnesota Vikings' 20th in the National Football League and their 14th under head coach Bud Grant. The Vikings finished with a 9–7 record, equal to that of the Detroit Lions, but won the NFC Central division title on the tiebreaker.

The most dramatic game of the season came in a Week 15 home game against Cleveland, with Minnesota at 8–6. The Vikings trailed 23–9 early in the fourth quarter, but with five seconds left in regulation, despite missing two field goals and two extra points in the game, they were on the Cleveland 46-yard line having reduced the Browns' lead to one point. Quarterback Tommy Kramer threw a Hail Mary pass that Ahmad Rashad at the 2-yard line before backing into the end zone to give Minnesota a 28–23 win.

Offseason

1980 Draft

 The Vikings traded their second- and third-round selections (39th and 65th overall) to the San Francisco 49ers in exchange for San Francisco's second-round selection (30th overall).
 The Vikings traded RB Steve Riley to the New Orleans Saints in exchange for New Orleans' third- and fifth-round selections (68th and 122nd overall).
 The Vikings traded their eighth-round selection (205th overall) to the Seattle Seahawks in exchange for DL Steve Niehaus.
 The Vikings originally had the 232nd overall selection, but passed allowing Buffalo to move up and Minnesota to choose 233rd overall.

Roster

Preseason

Regular season

Schedule

Note: Intra-division opponents are in bold text.

Game summaries

Week 15: vs Cleveland Browns

Trailing 23–9 entering the fourth quarter the Vikings came back and won on a desperation Hail Mary pass from quarterback Tommy Kramer to wide receiver Ahmad Rashad to clinch the NFC Central Division title in what became known as the "Miracle at the Met".

Standings

Postseason

Statistics

Team leaders

League rankings

References

1980
Minnesota
NFC Central championship seasons
Minnesota Vikings